The Hired Hand: An African-American Folktale is a 1997 book by Robert D. San Souci and illustrator Jerry Pinkney based on an African American folktale about an itinerant worker who is able to rejuvenate and resurrect people.

Reception
A review of The Hired Hand by Booklist wrote "He [Pinkney] successfully blends historically realistic details with timeless folkloric magic, and he enhances San Souci's smooth retelling in the process. An obvious choice for primary story hours, this will also make a welcome addition to African American folklore and history units.".

The Hired Hand has also been reviewed by Publishers Weekly, Kirkus Reviews, School Library Journal, and The Horn Book Magazine.

Awards
 1997 Aesop Prize - winner
1997 CCBC Choice
 1997 Commonwealth Club of California Book Award: Juvenile - Silver
 1997 New York Times Best Illustrated Books

References

1997 children's books
American picture books
Picture books by Jerry Pinkney
American folklore
Dial Press books